Türkiye Petrolleri Anonim Ortaklığı (TPAO) (Turkish Petroleum Corporation) was founded in 1954 by Law No. 6327 with the responsibility of being involved in hydrocarbon exploration, drilling, production, refinery and marketing activities of oil and gas in Turkey as the national company.

Being an important actor of the national economy, TPAO achieved many “firsts” of the Turkish oil industry. The company, its history reaching back over a half century, has given rise to seventeen major companies, including Petkim, Tüpraş and POAŞ to Turkey.

Until 1983, as an integrated oil company, it was engaged in all the activity fields of oil industry from exploration to production, refinery, marketing and transportation. Today, TPAO is a national oil company involved in merely upstream (exploration, drilling, well completion and production) sector.

Operations
The core activities of TPAO are:

 Exploration, drilling, production and well completion
 Natural gas storage
 Participation to oil and natural gas pipeline projects

Exploration

In accordance with the company's vision and mission for meeting Turkey’s continuously increasing oil and natural gas demand through domestic and international sources, with the new exploration strategy, the company extends its activities in unexplored basins of Turkey, especially Black Sea and Mediterranean offshore areas.

TPAO continues farm-out activities covering Mersin and İskenderun Bays licenses following Antalya Bay.

In 2013, the company purchased the seismographic research/survey vessel RV Barbaros Hayreddin Paşa worth US$130 million for gas and oil field exploration in Black Sea and the Mediterranean Sea.

Projects

Azerbaijan projects:
 Azeri–Chirag–Guneshli project with 6.75% share
 Shah Deniz gas field project with 19% share
 Baku–Tbilisi–Ceyhan pipeline project with 6.53% share
 South Caucasus Pipeline project with 9% share
 Alov Exploration project with 10% share

Iraq projects:
 Badra Oil Field Development project with 10% share
 Missan Oil Field Development project with 11.25% share
 Siba Gas Field Development project with 40% share
 Mansuriya Gas Field Development project with 50% share (operator)

Russia project:

TPAO acquired 49% of shares in MOL's BaiTex LLC, which is the holder of the hydrocarbon licenses for Baituganskoye field and Yerilkinsky block in the Volga-Ural region, Russia.

Milestones

1954: Foundation; capital: 150 million TL
1958: The first discovery; Germik Field
1959: The first district management “Batman”
1960: Application of secondary recovery process
1960: Establishment of İPRAŞ
1961: Discovery of the biggest oil field of Turkey - Batı Raman Field
1963: Establishment of the first service station
1965: Establishment of PETKİM
1966: Establishment of İPRAGAZ
1967: Establishment of Aliağa Refinery in İzmir
1967: Opening of the first pipeline (Batman-Dörtyol-İskenderun)
1968: Annual production: 1 million barrels
1968: TPAO Batman Orchestra awarded "Golden Microphone"
1969: Establishment of TÜMAŞ
1970: The first offshore exploration: Payas-1
1970: The first natural gas discovery: Thrace/Hamitabat
1971: Adıyaman's first oil discovery
1971: Establishment of İGSAŞ
1972: Adıyaman-Sarıl Oil Pipeline start-up
1974: Establishment of DİTAŞ, BOTAŞ and ADAŞ
1974: Establishment of research center
1974: Establishment of Cyprus Turkish Petroleum Ltd. Company
1975: Establishment of ISILİTAŞ
1975: 100 million barrels in production
1975: TPAO ranks 204th of the world's biggest companies at Fortune except USA
1976: Driiling of Akçakoca-1 well in the Black Sea
1977: Establishment of Ankara Drilling District Management
1980: New exploration strategies, big increase in discoveries
1980: TPAO ranks 97th of the world's biggest companies at Fortune except USA
1983: Establishment of Libya Arab-Turkish joint engineering and architecture company
1983: Status change in TPAO and disintegration starts
1983: TPAO assumed the title of the most oil producing company in Turkey
1984: Establishment of the second district management - “Thrace District Management”
1985: TPAO ranks 63rd of the world's biggest companies at Fortune except USA
1986: Establishment of Kırıkkale Refinery
1986: Drilling record in Turkey in 123 wells with 
1987: The deepest drilling in Demre-1 (Kaş-Antalya)
1987: TPAO in the international Arenaı
1988: Discoveries of Karakuş oil field in Adıyaman and K. Marmara natural gas fields in Marmara Sea
1988: Establishment of Turkish Petroleum International Company (TPIC)
1989: TPAO ranks 298th at Fortune except USA
1991: Modernization in interpretation systems-3D interpretation
1991: The first golden year - record in production of 50 years - 75.000 barrels/day - discovery of Karakuş oil field
1992: Establishment of the third district management “Adıyaman District Management”
1993: Establishment of joint company KTM Ltd.
1997: First offshore production in Kuzey Marmara Field
1998: First oil discovery in Western Anatolia; Alaşehir-1
1999: TPAO initializes the first underground natural gas storage in Turkey
1999: Baku-Tblisi-Ceyhan (BTC) main export oil pipeline project
2001: South Caucasus Natural Gas Pipeline Project (SCP)
2004: First natural gas discovery in Western Black Sea; Ayazlı-1
2007: Second golden year: 100.000 barrels/day production
2007: Starting of commercial activity of Northern Marmara and Değirmenköy (Silivri) Depleted Gas Reservoir
2007: First natural gas production in the Black Sea
2009: New drilling record; the drilling of the world's 46th deepest well with a vertical depth of 7,216 m
2010: Deep water drilling with "Leiv Eiriksson", Sinop-1 and Yassıhöyük-1; the first deep water operatorship (Yassıhöyük-1)
2011: Deep water drilling, Sürmene-1 
2011: Installation of Akçakoca offshore platform
Four Korean-built deepwater drillships are bought, named after four Ottoman sultans, and put into commission:
2018: Fatih
2019: Yavuz
2020 Kanuni
2022 Abdülhamid Han

Finance
In 2019 TPAO made an operating loss of 239 thousand lira for each of its 3700 employees.

References

External links

 Company website

Oil and gas companies of Turkey
Ministry of Energy and Natural Resources (Turkey)
Companies based in Ankara
Energy companies established in 1954
Non-renewable resource companies established in 1954
1954 establishments in Turkey